Esveida Bravo Martínez (born 12 October 1932) is a Mexican politician from the Ecologist Green Party of Mexico. She has served as Deputy of the LVIII and LX Legislatures of the Mexican Congress representing Morelos.

References

1932 births
Living people
Politicians from Mexico City
Women members of the Chamber of Deputies (Mexico)
Ecologist Green Party of Mexico politicians
21st-century Mexican politicians
21st-century Mexican women politicians
Deputies of the LX Legislature of Mexico
Members of the Chamber of Deputies (Mexico) for Morelos